Hoklabari was a village development committee in Morang District in the Koshi Zone of south-eastern Nepal. 
In 2017 it was absorbed by the newly created Kanepokhari Rural Municipality.

Location

Hoklabari was in Nepal, Eastern Region, Kosī Zone, Morang.
The Köppen climate classification is Cwa : Monsoon-influenced humid subtropical climate.

Population

Majority ethnic groups are Chettri and Brahmins alongside Santal and others.
This village is famous for production of mustard and is also a major cultivator of rice and wheat.

At the time of the 1991 Nepal census it had a population of 4,520 people living in 806 individual households.
The table below shows the populations in 2011 of the wards of Kanepokhari Rural Municipality. Hoklabari became Ward 1 when Kanepokhari  was constituted in March 2017.

References

Kanepokhari Rural Municipality